Stanford End Mill and River Loddon is a  biological Site of Special Scientific Interest south of Reading in Berkshire. It covers  Stanford End Mill meadows and a  stretch of the River Loddon between Stanford End and Sheep Bridge north-west of Swallowfield.

The mill was built in early Victorian times on the Stratfield Saye estate.

Fauna
The site has the following animals

Mammals
European water vole

Birds
Little grebe
Moorhen
Coot
Mute swan
Common kingfisher

Invertebrates
Pisidium moitessierianum
Pisidium tenuilineatum
Vertigo antivertigo
Vertigo moulinsiana

Flora

The site has the following Flora:

Trees
Alder
Salix alba
Fraxinus
Quercus robur

Plants
Fritillaria meleagris
Potamogeton nodosus
Alopecurus pratensis
Holcus lanatus
Ranunculus acris
Rumex acetosa
Plantago lanceolata
Centaurea nigra
Rhinanthus  minor
Silaum silaus
Ophioglossum vulgatum
Carex disticha
Carex panicea
Cardamine pratensis
Lychnis flos-cuculi
Oenanthe fistulosa
Potamogeton pectinatus
Nuphar lutea
Sagitarria sagittifolia
Schoenoplectus lacustris
Sparganium erectum
Epilobium hirsutum
Eupatorium cannabinum
Symphytum officinale
Lythrum salicaria
Filipendula ulmaria
Petasites hybridus
Myosotis scorpioides
Myosoton aquaticum
Nasturtium officinale
Urtica dioica
Dipsacus fullonum

References

Sites of Special Scientific Interest in Berkshire
Swallowfield